This is a list of notable Belgian people who either:
 are or were Belgian citizens at least for sometime in their life,
 were born in Belgium or in the provinces of present-day Belgium, but who were not or are not Belgian citizens (either because Belgium did not exist at the time of their life or because they had or have another citizenship). The names of people of this category are italicized.

The list also comprises
 fictional characters who are undisputedly Belgians
 important ones whose citizenship is unknown, or not Belgian and with Belgian creators. The names of fictional characters of this category are italicized.

The same person may appear under several headings.

Artists & Writers

 Nicolas Ancion (born 1971)
 Gentil Theodoor Antheunis (1840–1907)
 Pieter Aspe (1953–2021)
 Henry Bauchau (1913–2012)
 Jean-Marie Berckmans (1953–2008)
 Anton Bergmann (1835–1874)
 Hendrik Beyaert (1823–1894)
 Philipp Blommaert (1809–1871)
 Louis Paul Boon (1912–1979)
 Cris Brodahl (born 1963)
 Elisa Brune (born 1966)
 Herman Brusselmans (born 1957)
 Cyriel Buysse (1859–1932)
 Emile Cammaerts (1878–1953)
 Sophie Cauvin (born 1968)
 Ernest Claes (1885–1968)
 Hugo Claus (1929–2008)
 Hendrik Conscience (1812–1883)
 Julio Cortázar – Argentinian writer born in Brussels
 Joanna Courtmans (1811–1890)
 Fernand Crommelynck
 Albéric d'Auxy
 Johan Daisne
 Jacques Danois (1927–2008)
 Johan Michiel Dautzenberg (1808–1869)
 Herman de Coninck (1944–1997)
 Charles De Coster (1827–1879)
 Julius de Geyter (1830–1905)
 Xaveer De Geyter (born 1957)
 Michel De Ghelderode (1898–1962)
 Lodewijk de Koninck (1838–1924)
 Gilbert Delahaye
 Patricia de Martelaere
 Pol de Mont (1857–1931)
 Filip De Pillecyn (1891–1962)
 Paul De Wispelaere
 Christine D'Haen
 Neel Doff (1858–1942)
 Maria Doolaeghe (1803–1884)
 Gaston Durnez (1928–2019)
 Georges Eekhoud
 Willem Elsschot
 Jef Geeraerts
 Guido Gezelle
 Marnix Gijsen (1899–1984)
 Maurice Gilliams
 Germain Joseph Hallez
 Paul Hankar (1859–1901)
 Jacqueline Harpman
 Kristien Hemmerechts
 Stefan Hertmans
 Victor Horta (1861–1947) – architect and designer
 Henry Kistemaeckers – novelist, and playwright (1872–1938)
 Hubert Lampo
 Tom Lanoye
 Victor Leclercq
 Karel Lodewijk Ledeganck (1805–1847)
 Camille Lemonnier
 Suzanne Lilar – essayist, novelist, and playwright (1901–1992)
 Rosalie Loveling (1834–1875)
 Virginie Loveling (1836–1923)
 Maurice Maeterlinck – Nobel Prize in Literature 1911
 Marcel Mariën – surrealist
 Bob Mendes
 Pierre Mertens
 Henri Michaux – poet and painter
 Ivo Michiels
 Léonard Misonne (1870–1943) – photographer, a founder of Pictorialism
 Erwin Mortier – novelist, essayist, poet
 Alice Nahon
 Leonard Nolens
 Amélie Nothomb
 Pierre Nothomb
 Paul Nougé – surrealist
 Octave Pirmez
 Charles Plisnier – Prix Goncourt 1937
 Sophie Podolski (1953–1974)
 Anne Provoost
 Jean Ray (pseudonym for Raymundus Joannes de Kremer) (1887–1964)
 Frans Rens (1805–1874)
 Albrecht Rodenbach
 Georges Rodenbach – Symbolist poet and novelist
 Maria Rosseels (1916–2005)
 Ward Ruyslinck
 Paul Saintenoy (1862–1952)
 Gustave Serrurier-Bovy (1858–1910)
 Georges Simenon (1903–1989)
 Jan Lambrecht Domien Sleeckx (1818–1901)
 Ferdinand Augustijn Snellaert (1809–1872)
 August Snieders (1825–1904)
 Jan Renier Snieders (1812–1888)
 Reimond Stijns (1850–1905)
 Gustave Strauven (1878–1919)
 Stijn Streuvels
Christophe Szpajdel (born 1970)
 Herman Teirlinck
 Isidoor Teirlinck (1851–1934)
 Jotie T'Hooft
 Felix Timmermans
 Jan van Beers (1852–1927)
 Jos Vandeloo
 Walter van den Broeck
 Henry Van de Velde (1863–1957)
 Karel van de Woestijne
 Prudens van Duyse (1804–1859)
 Raoul Vaneigem
 Peter Frans Van Kerckhoven (1818–1857)
 Jacob van Maerlant
 Jacques van Melkebeke
 Paul Van Ostaijen
 Bob Van Reeth (born 1943)
 Jan Theodoor van Rijswijck (1811–1849)
 Anton van Wilderode (1918–1998)
 Emile Verhaeren
 Peter Verhelst
 Dimitri Verhulst
 August Vermeylen (1872–1945)
 Henri Vernes
 Jules Wabbes (1919–1974)
 Gerard Walschap
 François Weyergans
 Jan Frans Willems (1793–1846)
 Marguerite Yourcenar – French novelist born in Belgium

Businesspeople and economists
 Luc Bertrand
 Philippus Jacobus Brepols (1778–1845)
 John Cockerill
 Marc Coucke
 Étienne Davignon
 Gustave de Molinari – economist
 Édouard-Jean Empain
 Édouard Louis Joseph Empain
 George Arthur Forrest
 Albert Frère – self made businessman
 Alexandre Galopin (1879–1944) – director of the Société Générale de Belgique
 Silvio Gesell
 Lieven Gevaert
 Eric Ghysels
 Jean-Pierre Hansen (born 1948) – CEO of Electrabel
 Rob Heyvaert – founder of Capco
 Georges Jacobs
 André Leysen and his sons Christian Leysen and Thomas Leysen
 Maurice Lippens
 Alfred Lowenstein (1877–1928), soldier, aviator, sportsman, entrepreneur
 Georges Nagelmackers
 Philippe van Parijs
 Bruno van Pottelsberghe (born 1968)

Criminals
 Nordine Ben Allal – multiple escapes
 Madani Bouhouche – police officer, accused of being a member of the Brabant killers
 Pierre Carette – terrorist, member of the Communist Combatant Cells
 Kim De Gelder – murdered several babies in a babycare center
 Muriel Degauque – Belgian woman who committed a suicide terrorist attack in Bagdad in 2005
 Marc Dutroux – rapist and serial killer
 Bert Eriksson – head of the extreme-right organisation Vlaamse Militanten Orde, convicted for founding a private army
 Patrick Haemers – kidnapper of former Prime Minister Paul Vanden Boeynants
 Murat Kaplan – co-member of Patrick Haemers' gang
 Jean-Baptiste Sipido – tried to assassinate Edward VII of the United Kingdom (still then Crown Prince) during a 1900 visit to Brussels
 Jean-Pierre Van Rossem – convicted for Ponzi fraud
 Hans Van Themsche – teenager with far-right sympathies who went on a killing spree and murdered three people in the street
 Robert Jan Verbelen – Nazi collaborator and murderer of businessman Alexandre Galopin
 Hippolyte Visart de Bocarmé – nobleman who poisoned his brother-in-law with nicotine

Fictional characters

 Achilles de Flandres – antagonist in Orson Scott Card's Shadow series
 Adhemar – comics character by Marc Sleen
 Dr. Evil – main villain in the Austin Powers films
 Gaston Lagaffe – comics character by André Franquin
 Jo, Zette and Jocko – comics characters by Hergé
 Jommeke – comics character by Jef Nys
 De Kiekeboes – comics characters by Merho
Marc Lebut, who drives a Ford T, and his neighbour – comics characters created by Francis with Maurice Tillieux
 Modeste et Pompon – comics characters by André Franquin
 Nero comics character by Marc Sleen
 Piet Pienter en Bert Bibber, comics characters by Pom. 
 Hercule Poirot – literary detective, created by Agatha Christie.
 Quick & Flupke – comics characters by Hergé who live in Brussels. 
 Samson en Gert – characters from a popular Flemish television series
 Suske en Wiske – comics characters by Willy Vandersteen.
 Spirou et Fantasio – comics characters by André Franquin
 Tintin – as well as the gallery of comics characters created by Hergé.

Historians

 Philippe de Commines
 Victor Amédée Jacques Marie Coremans (1802–1872)
 François-Louis Ganshof
 Xavier Mabille
 Ludo Martens
 Anne Morelli
 Henri Pirenne
 Pierre François Xavier de Ram
 Jan Vansina

Humorists
 Alex Agnew – also the lead singer of Diablo Blvd
 Gaston Berghmans
 Jan Bucquoy
 Annie Cordy
 Wouter Deprez
 Raymond Devos
 Bert Gabriëls
 Philippe Geluck – best known for his comic strip Le Chat
 Noël Godin – "l'entarteur", aka Monsieur Gloup-Gloup
 Geert Hoste
 Kamagurka
 Hugo Matthysen
 Lieven Scheire
 Les Snuls
 Urbain Servranckx (Urbanus)
 Mark Uytterhoeven

Journalists
 Paul Beliën
 Jacques Danois
 Koenraad Elst
 Cédric Gerbehaye
 Eugénie Hamer (1865–after 1926)
 Françoise Van De Moortel
 Germaine Van Parys (1893–1983) – pioneering female photojournalist

Military figures
 Ambiorix – Gaulish warlord
 Baldwin I of Constantinople – Crusader, first Latin Emperor
 Baldwin I of Jerusalem – Crusader, King of Jerusalem
   Jean-Pierre de Beaulieu – Belgian-born Austrian general
   Adrian Carton de Wiart – Belgian-born British lieutenant general
 Charlemagne – founder of the Frankish Empire
 Charles V – Holy Roman Emperor
 Clovis I, King of the Franks
 Godfrey of Bouillon – Crusader and first King of Jerusalem
 Charles Martel – Duke of the Franks, stopped the Muslim expansion at Poitiers
 Pepin of Herstal – Duke of the Franks
 Pepin the Short – first Carolingian King of the Franks
 Edgard Potier – pilot during World War II
 Jean Schramme – mercenary
 Johann Tserclaes, Count of Tilly – field marshal
 Léon de Witte – General during World War I
 Count Henry Robert Visart de Bury et de Bocarmé C.B.E. – lieutenant colonel  (ret'd)

Models 
 Brigitta Callens
 Elise Crombez
 Sylvie De Caluwé
 Véronique De Kock (born in Antwerp)
 Hannelore Knuts
 Yumi Lambert
 Anouck Lepere – supermodel (born in Antwerp) 
 Stephanie Meire
 Hanne Gaby Odiele
 Angeline Flor Pua (born in Antwerp), crowned Miss Belgium 2018
 Ellen Petri 
 Ingrid Seynhaeve
 Jessica Van Der Steen (from Antwerp)
 Ann Van Elsen

Monarchs

 Albert I
 Albert II
 Baudouin
 Charles V of Habsburg – Holy Roman Emperor
 Charles VII of Habsburg – Holy Roman Emperor
 Charlemagne – Holy Roman Emperor
 Clemens August of Bavaria, Archbishop-Elector of Cologne
 Leopold I
 Leopold II
 Leopold III
Carlota of Mexico
 Philippe

Performing artists

Actors and actresses

  Natacha Amal
  Patrick Bauchau
  Veerle Baetens
  Céline Buckens
  Jey Crisfar
  François Damiens
  Koen De Bouw
  Jan Decleir
  André Delvaux
  Émilie Dequenne
  Els Dottermans
  Tim Driesen
  Cécile de France
  Virginie Efira
  Victor Francen
  Johnny Galecki
  Henri Garcin
  Marie Gillain
  Olivier Gourmet
  Johan Heldenbergh
  Audrey Hepburn
  Christian Labeau
  Jacky Lafon
  Bouli Lanners
  Johan Leysen
  Yolande Moreau
  Filip Peeters
  Ann Petersen
  Benoît Poelvoorde
  Eline Powell
  Natacha Régnier
  Lyne Renée
  Jérémie Renier
  Matthias Schoenaerts
  Jean-Claude Van Damme
  Peter Van Den Begin
  Dora van der Groen
  Marie Vinck
  Philippe Volter
  Titus De Voogdt
  Tom Waes

Composers 

 Jean Absil
 Florent Alpaerts
 Peter Benoit
 Gilles Binchois
 Ivan Caryll
 Jacob Clemens non Papa
 Marie Daulne
 Frédéric Devreese
 Guillaume Dufay
 François Joseph Fétis
 César Franck – Belgian composer who worked in Paris
 Karel Goeyvaerts
 Nicolas Gombert
 François Joseph Gossec
 André Grétry
 Henri-Guillaume Hamal
 Joseph Jongen
 Orlande de Lassus (a.k.a. Orlandus Lassus/Orlando di Lasso)  – born in the provinces of present-day Belgium, but before Belgium existed
 Guillaume Lekeu
 Jacques Loeillet – baroque composer
 Jean-Baptiste Loeillet de Ghent – baroque composer
 Charles Loos
 Wim Mertens
 Vidna Obmana – pseudonym of Dirk Serries
 Johannes Ockeghem
 Henri Pousseur
 Josquin des Prez
 Cypriano de Rore
 Didier van Damme
 Pieter van Maldere
 Carl Verbraeken
 Henri Vieuxtemps
 Giaches de Wert
 Adrian Willaert
 Eugène Ysaÿe

Dance and choreography 
 Anne Teresa de Keersmaeker, choreographer
Adam-Pierre de La Grené, dancer

Filmmakers

 Chantal Akerman (Jeanne Dielman, 23 quai du Commerce, 1080 Bruxelles)
 Jean-Jacques Andrien (Le Grand Paysage d'Alexis Droeven)
 Nic Balthazar (Ben X)
 Tom Barman (Any Way the Wind Blows)
 Lucas Belvaux (Man Bites Dog)
 Rémy Belvaux (Man Bites Dog)
 Nabil Ben Yadir (The Barons)
 Alain Berliner (Ma vie en rose, Le Mur)
 Jan Bucquoy (La Vie sexuelle des Belges 1950–1978, Camping Cosmos)
 Hugo Claus (The Sacrament)
 Stijn Coninx (Daens)
 Carl Colpaert (American, born in Belgium)
 Gérard Corbiau (The Music Teacher, Farinelli)
 Jean-Pierre Dardenne and Luc Dardenne (The Promise, The Son, L'Enfant)
 Robbe De Hert (Whitey, Blueberry Hill)
 André Delvaux (The Man Who Had His Hair Cut Short, One Night... A Train)
 Armand Denis (Savage Splendor, Below the Sahara)
 Dominique Deruddere (Everybody's Famous!)
 Marc Didden (Brussels by Night)
 Jacques Feyder (Carnival in Flanders)
 Jonas Geirnaert (Flatlife)
 Harry Kümel (Daughters of Darkness, Monsieur Hawarden, Malpertuis)
 Bouli Lanners
 Roland Lethem
 Benoît Mariage
 Picha (Tarzoon: Shame of the Jungle)
 Michaël R. Roskam (Bullhead)
 Raoul Servais (Harpya)
 Henri Storck (Misère au Borinage)
 Guy Lee Thys (The Pencil Murders, Kassablanka)
 Patrice Toye (Rosie)
 Jan Vanderheyden – (De Witte)
 Jaco Van Dormael – (Toto the Hero, The Eighth Day)
 Felix Van Groeningen – (Steve + Sky, De helaasheid der dingen, The Broken Circle Breakdown)
 Erik Van Looy (The Alzheimer Case, Loft)
 Frank Van Passel (Manneken Pis)
 Roland Verhavert (Seagulls Die in the Harbour)
 Henry Xhonneux  (Marquis)
 Thierry Zéno (Vase de Noces, better known as The Pigfucking Movie)

Musicians and singers

  Salvatore Adamo (Italian living in Belgium)
  Alice on the Roof
  Angèle
  Geike Arnaert – Hooverphonic
  Natacha Atlas
  Typh Barrow
  Blanche
  Baloji – Starflam
  Tom Barman – dEUS
  Claude Barzotti
  Plastic Bertrand – Roger Jouret
  Sam Bettens – K's Choice
  Sandy Boets – Xandee
  Francy Boland – jazz pianist, arranger
  Bony King of Nowhere
  Brahim (Belgian singer)
  André Brasseur
  Jacques Brel
  Tina Bride
  Alex Callier – Hooverphonic
  Stef Kamil Carlens – Zita Swoon
  Philippe Catherine
  Ann Christy
  André Cluytens – Belgian-born conductor
  Annie Cordy
  Mathieu Crickboom – violinist
  Suzanne Danco – soprano
  Marie Daulne – Zap Mama
  Jeanine Deckers – Soeur Sourire a.k.a. The Singing Nun
  Wim De Craene
  Arthur De Greef – pianist and composer
  Jean-Luc De Meyer – Front 242
  Luc De Vos – Gorki
  Tom Dice
  Mike Dierickx – Push, M.I.K.E.; trance DJ and producer
  Elmore D
  Tim Driesen
  Maurice Engelen – Praga Khan, Lords of Acid
  Peter Evrard – winner of Idool 2003, Belgian edition of Pop Idol
  Lara Fabian
  Frédéric François
  Stéphane Galland
  Wouter de Backer – Gotye (born in Belgium, now lives in Australia)
  Ferre Grignard
  Piet Goddaer – Ozark Henry
  Rita Gorr – mezzo-soprano
  Arthur Grumiaux – violinist
  David Guetta – French disc jockey of Belgian descent on mother's side
  Hadise
  Fanny Heldy – opera soprano
  Philippe Herreweghe – conductor
  Arno Hintjens – TC Matic
  Bobby Jaspar
  Ya Kid K – Technotronic
  Sandra Kim
  Dani Klein – Vaya Con Dios
  Flip Kowlier
  Sigiswald Kuijken  –  violinist and conductor
  Philippe Lafontaine
  Victor Lazlo
  Fud Leclerc
  Pierre Leemans  – conductor and composer
  Jo Lemaire
  Jan Leyers – Soulsister
  Lio
  Charles Loos
  Helmut Lotti
  Machiavel
  Maurane
  Paul Michiels – Soulsister
  Brian Molko – Placebo
  Marc Moulin – Telex
  Loïc Nottet 
  Mauro Pawlowski – Evil Superstars, dEUS
  Bart Peeters
  Belle Perez
  Frédérique Petrides (née Mayer)  – conductor
  Pol Plançon  – basso
  Pierre Rapsat
  Hugo Raspoet
  Axelle Red
  Django Reinhardt
  Roméo Elvis
  Kate Ryan
  Liliane Saint-Pierre
  Bobbejaan Schoepen
  Siouxsie Sioux (Belgian father, English mother)
  Jonas Steur – trance DJ and producer
  Stromae 
  Selah Sue 
  Woodie Smalls – Rapper and Songwriter
  Tamino
  Toots Thielemans
  René Thomas
  Rudy Trouvé
  Will Tura
  Luc van Acker  – of the Revolting Cocks
  Urbanus van Anus
  Tim Vanhamel – Evil Superstars, Eagles of Death Metal, Millionaire
  Paul Van Haver – Stromae
  Raymond van het Groenewoud
  Dirk Verbeuren – Soilwork
  Peter Verhoyen  – flutist
  Eddy Wally
  Koen Wauters – Clouseau
  Kris Wauters – Clouseau
  Anne Wolf  –  pianist
  Eugène Ysaÿe   –  violinist and composer

Theater directors
 Christian Labeau
 Stephen Shank

Politicians

A – C
 Frans Ackerman
 Magda Aelvoet
 Meyrem Almaci
 Bert Anciaux
 Jules Joseph d'Anethan
 Gerolf Annemans
 Bernard Anselme
 Marie Arena
 Auguste Beernaert – Nobel Peace Prize 1908
 Wouter Beke
 Ivo Belet
 Ward Beysen
 Fons Borginon
 Geert Bourgeois
 Frederika Brepoels
 Charles de Broqueville
 Henri de Brouckere
 Jules de Burlet
 Bernard du Bus de Gisignies
 Philippe Busquin
 Henri Carton de Wiart
 Marcel Cheron
 Willy Claes
 Philip Claeys
 Guy Coëme
 Alexandra Colen
 André Cools
 Gerhard Cooreman
 Hugo Coveliers
 Hilde Crevits

D
 Rik Daems
 Michel Daerden
 André Damseaux
 José Daras
 August De Boodt
 Stefaan De Clerck
 Willy De Clercq
 Herman De Croo
 Alexander De Croo
 Armand De Decker
 Jean-Marie Dedecker
 Jean Defraigne
 Magda De Galan
 Léon Degrelle
 Karel De Gucht
Bart De Wever
 Jean Duvieusart
 Jean-Luc Dehaene
 Jean-Maurice Dehousse
 Véronique De Keyser
 Leon Delacroix
 Francis Delpérée
 Hendrik de Man
 Rudy Demotte
 Gérard Deprez
 Erik Derycke
 Paul Deschanel
 Alain Destexhe
 Mia De Vits
 Patrick Dewael
 Filip Dewinter
 Karel Dillen
 Koenraad Dillen
 Elio Di Rupo 
 François-Xavier de Donnea
 Vera Dua
 Daniel Ducarme
 Antoine Duquesne
 Isabelle Durant

E – K
 Lamoral Egmont
 Saïd El Khadraoui
 Gaston Eyskens
 Mark Eyskens
 Michel Foret
 Richard Fournaux
 Walthère Frère-Orban
 Jaak Gabriëls
 Isabelle Gatti
 Gaston Geens
 Koen Geens
 Caroline Gennez
 Jacques Germeaux
 Jean Gol
 Mathieu Grosch
 Michel Hansenne
 Pierre Harmel
 Hervé Hasquin
 Arthur Haulot
 Alain Hutchinson
 Camille Huysmans
 Paul-Émile Janson
 Henri Jaspar
 Pierre Jonckheer

L
 Henri La Fontaine – Nobel Peace Prize 1913
 Julien Lahaut (1884–1950) – chairman of the Communist Party, assassinated
 Roger Lallemand
 Auguste Lambermont
 Karl-Heinz Lambertz
 Renaat Landuyt
 Raymond Langendries
 Joseph Lebeau
 Edmond Leburton
 Theodore Lefèvre
 Yves Leterme
 Anne-Marie Lizin

M
 Nelly Maes
 Philippe Mahoux
 Olivier Maingain
 Jules Malou
 Jean-Claude Marcourt
 Ludo Martens
 Wilfried Martens
 Philippe Maystadt
 Charles Michel 
 Louis Michel
 Joëlle Milquet
 Philippe Monfils
 Philippe Moureaux
 Felix de Muelenare

N–R
 Annemie Neyts-Uyttebroeck
 Jean-Baptiste Nothomb
 Charles-Ferdinand Nothomb
 Laurette Onkelinx
 Kris Peeters
 Joseph Pholien
 Charles Picqué
 Hubert Pierlot
 Prosper Poullet
 Jules Renkin
 Jean Rey
 Didier Reynders
 Frédérique Ries
 Charles Rogier
 Gustave Rolin-Jaequemyns – founder of Institut de Droit International, adviser to Rama V of Thailand
 Jean-Pierre Van Rossem

S–U
 Hugo Schiltz (1927–2006)
 Frans Schollaert
 Jacques Simonet
 Miet Smet
 Paul de Smet de Naeyer
 Bart Somers
 Antoinette Spaak
 Paul-Henri Spaak
 Guy Spitaels
 Bart Staes
 Dirk Sterckx
 Steve Stevaert
 Frank Swaelen
 Marc Tarabella
 George Theunis
 Bartholemy Théodore de Theux
 Freddy Thielemans
 Marianne Thyssen
 Leo Tindemans
 Bruno Tobback
 Louis Tobback
 Jules de Trooz

V
 Achille van Acker
 Jacob van Artevelde
 Frans Van Cauwelaert
 Jean-Claude Van Cauwenberghe
 Johan Vande Lanotte
 Hugo Vandenberghe
 Paul Vanden Boeynants
 Freya Van den Bossche
 Luc Van den Bossche
 Frank Vandenbroucke
 Jules Vandenpeereboom
 The family Vanderpoorten: Arthur, Herman and Marleen
 Emile Vandervelde
 Frank Vanhecke
 Johan Van Hecke
 Pierre-Edouard van Humbeeck
 Anne Van Lancker
 Dirk Van Mechelen
 Karel Van Miert
 Vincent Van Quickenborne
 Eric Van Rompuy
 Herman Van Rompuy
 Jean-Pierre Van Rossem
 Paul Van Zeeland
 Guy Verhofstadt
 Inge Vervotte

W – Y
 Melchior Wathelet
 Freddy Willockx
 Charles Woeste
 Yvan Ylieff

Religious figures

Saints
 St. Damien of Molokai
 St. Gertrude of Nivelles
 St. Gudula from Brussels and Eibingen – National Saint of Belgium and Patroness of Brussels
 St. Hubertus
 St. John Berchmans
 St. Meingold of Huy

Theologians and clergymen
 Joseph André – priest, Righteous among the Nations
 Pieter Jan Beckx – 22nd Superior General of the Jesuits
 Jean Bolland – hagiographer
 Adolf Daens – priest and politician
 Godfried Danneels – cardinal
 Victor-Auguste Dechamps – cardinal
 Jozef De Kesel – cardinal
 Jacques Dupuis – Jesuit theologian (interreligious dialogue)
 Pierre-Lambert Goossens – cardinal
 Henry of Ghent – medieval philosopher
 Augustinus Hunnaeus – theologian
 Cornelius Jansen – bishop, theologian (Jansenism)
 Jean-Baptiste Janssens – 27th Superior General of the Jesuits
 Gustaaf Joos – cardinal
 Peter Paul Lefevere – bishop
 André-Mutien Léonard – archbishop
 Leonardus Lessius – Jesuit theologian
 Joseph Maréchal – philosopher, psychologist
 Désiré-Joseph Mercier – cardinal
 Everard Mercurian – 4th Superior General of the Jesuits
 Charles de Noyelle – 12th Superior General of the Jesuits
 Georges Pire – Dominican priest, Nobel Peace Prize 1958
 Edward Poppe – blessed priest
 Jozef-Ernest van Roey – cardinal
 Blessed John Ruysbroeck – mystic
 Jan Pieter Schotte – cardinal
 Brother René Stockman – Superior General of the Congregation of the Brothers of Charity
 Leo Jozef Suenens – cardinal
 Franciscus van den Enden – philosopher, teacher, pioneer of the idea of democracy
 Ferdinand Verbiest – Jesuit missionary in China, astronomer

Resistance activists
 Marie Bouffa (1882–1945)
 Albert Guérisse (1911–1989)
 Arthur Haulot (1913–2005)
 Andrée "Dédée" de Jongh (1916–2007)
 Marcel Louette (1907–1978)
 Edgard Potier (1903–1944)
 Henri Reynders (1903–1981)
 Suzanne Spaak (1905–1944)
 Gabrielle Weidner (1914–1945)
 Johan Hendrik Weidner (1912–1994)

Scientists

Astronauts
 Frank De Winne
 Dirk Frimout – first Belgian astronaut

Botanists
 Alfred Cogniaux (1841–1916)
 Rembert Dodoens (1517–1585)
 Barthélemy Charles Joseph du Mortier
 Annick Wilmotte (graduated 1982) – polar microbiologist

Chemists
 Jan Baptist van Helmont (1579–1644) – chemist and physician
 Jean-Claude Lorquet – theoretical chemist
 Ilya Prigogine – theoretical chemist Nobel Prize in Chemistry 1977 (born in Russia)
 Ernest Solvay
 Jean Stas

Geographers
 Gerardus Mercator
 Abraham Ortelius

Geologists
 Gaston Briart
 Alphonse François Renard – geologist and petrographer

Inventors and engineers
 Leo Hendrik Baekeland – inventor of bakelite
 Alfred Belpaire – steam locomotive engineer
 Robert Cailliau – information and control engineer
 Joan Daemen – cryptographer (Advanced Encryption Standard (AES), Rijndael)
 Zénobe Gramme – electrical engineer
 Étienne Lenoir – engineer
 John Joseph Merlin – inventor associated with Cox's timepiece; also invented inline skates in 1759
 Bart Preneel – cryptographer
 Vincent Rijmen – cryptographer (Advanced Encryption Standard (AES), Rijndael)
 Adolphe Sax – inventor of the saxophone
 Rennequin Sualem – created the Machine de Marly
 Arthur Vierendeel – engineer and inventor of the Vierendeel truss
 Egide Walschaerts – steam locomotive engineer and inventor of the Walschaerts valve gear
 André Waterkeyn – engineer, best known for creating the Atomium

Mathematicians
 François d'Aguilon – mathematician and physicist (optics)
 Jean Bourgain
 Eugène Charles Catalan
 Ingrid Daubechies – mathematician and physicist
 Pierre Deligne – Fields Medal 1978
 Jan Denef
 Jean-Charles de la Faille
 Victor D'Hondt – lawyer and mathematician
 Maurice Kraitchik – number theorist and recreational mathematician
 Constantin Le Paige
 Adolphe Quetelet – mathematician and statistician
 Grégoire de Saint-Vincent
 Simon Stevin – mathematician and engineer
 André Tacquet
 Antoine Thomas – mathematician and astronomer (in China)
 Joseph Tilly
 Jacques Tits
 Charles Jean de la Vallée-Poussin
 Adriaan van Roomen

Medical scientists
 Jules Bordet – Nobel Prize in Physiology or Medicine 1919
 Albert Claude – Nobel Prize in Physiology or Medicine 1974
 Christian De Duve – Nobel Prize in Physiology or Medicine 1974 (born in Britain of Belgian parents)
 Corneille Heymans – Nobel Prize in Physiology or Medicine 1938
 Albert Hustin – medical doctor, the first to practice non-direct blood transfusion
 Paul Janssen – scientist and founder of Janssen Pharmaceutica
 Marc Lacroix – biochemist and cancer researcher
 Benoît Lengelé – medical doctor, the first to perform a partial face transplant
 Louis-Joseph Seutin – surgeon
 Edouard Van Beneden – embryologist, cytologist and marine biologist
 Catherine Verfaillie – stem cell researcher
 Andreas Vesalius – anatomist
 Luc Calliauw – brain surgeon and professor
Rudi Pauwels – pharmacologist and entrepreneur

Philosophers
 Jan Deckers
 Luce Irigaray – French philosopher, born in Belgium
 Isabelle Stengers
 Etienne Vermeersch

Physicists
 Robert Brout
 François Englert – Nobel Prize in Physics 2013
 Jean-Pierre Leburton
 Georges Lemaître – deviser of the Big Bang Theory
 Joseph Plateau
 Daniel Zajfman (born 1959) – Israeli physicist; president of the Weizmann Institute

Political scientists and theorists
 Rik Coolsaet
 Vincent de Coorebyter
 Abram Leon
 Ernest Mandel
 Chantal Mouffe

Social scientists
 Paul Jorion – anthropologist, sociologist, cognitive scientist, and economist
 Claude Lévi-Strauss –  French social scientist born in Belgium
 Renee Rabinowitz – psychologist and lawyer

Others
 Louis De Geer (1587–1652)  – born in Liège; considered the father of Swedish industry
 Charles Frédéric Dubois and his son Alphonse Joseph Charles Dubois – naturalists
 Adrien de Gerlache – explorer
 John of Gaunt, 1st Duke of Lancaster – born in Ghent
 Justus Lipsius – classical philologian
 Michel Louette – ornithologist
 Paul Otlet – information architect
 Marc Waelkens – archaeologist

Sports

Automobile racing
 Philippe Adams – Formula One driver
 Éric Bachelart – IndyCar driver
 Bertrand Baguette – 2009 World Series by Renault champion, IndyCar driver
 Georges Berger – Formula One driver
 Lucien Bianchi – Formula One driver
 Thierry Boutsen – racing driver
 Johnny Claes – Formula One driver
 Jérôme d'Ambrosio – Formula One and Formula E driver
 Grégoire De Mévius – rally driver
 Didier de Radiguès – MotoGP rider and sports car racer
 Charles de Tornaco – Formula One driver
 Marc Duez – racing driver
 François Duval – rally driver
 Paul Frère – Formula One driver
 Bertrand Gachot – racing driver
 Olivier Gendebien – race car driver
 Christian Goethals – Formula One driver
 Jan Heylen – Champ Car veteran
 Jacky Ickx – racing driver
 Vanina Ickx – daughter of Jacky, Le Mans regular
 Camille Jenatzy – race car driver
 Arthur Legat – Formula One driver
 Bas Leinders – racing driver
 Freddy Loix – rally driver
 Willy Mairesse – Formula One driver
 André Milhoux – Formula One driver
 Thierry Neuville – rally driver
 Patrick Nève – Formula One driver
 André Pilette – Formula One driver
 Teddy Pilette (born 1942) – Formula One driver
 Théodore Pilette – racing driver
 Lance Stroll (born 1998) – Belgian-Canadian racing driver
 Jacques Swaters – Formula One driver
 Didier Theys – Sportscar and IndyCar driver
 Bruno Thiry – rally driver
 Eric van de Poele – Formula One driver
 Stoffel Vandoorne – Formula One and Formula E driver
 Jean-Pierre Van Rossem – Owner of Onyx Moneytron Grand Prix (Formula One Team)
 Max Verstappen – Belgian-Dutch Formula One driver

Basketball 
 Julie Allemand
 Marjorie Carpréaux
 Antonia Delaere
 Manu Lecomte (born 1995)
 Emma Meesseman
 Hanne Mestdagh
 Kim Mestdagh
 Retin Obasohan 
 Tomas Van Den Spiegel
 Willy Steveniers
Andy Van Vliet
 Ann Wauters
Maxime De Zeeuw

Cycling
Including mountain biking and cyclo-cross
 Mario Aerts
 Benoni Beheyt
 Kenny Belaey
 Tom Boonen
 Johan Bruyneel
 Alex Close
 Fred de Bruyne
 Nicky Degrendele – world champion keirin
 Erik De Vlaeminck – cyclo-cross
 Roger De Vlaeminck
 Etienne De Wilde
 Stijn Devolder
 Jolien D'Hoore
 Hélène Dutrieu
 Remco Evenepoel
 Philippe Gilbert
 Matthew Gilmore – Australian-turned-Belgian
 Willy Lauwers
 Roland Liboton – cyclo-cross
 Freddy Maertens
 Romain Maes
 Filip Meirhaeghe – mountain biker
 Axel Merckx – son of Eddy Merckx
 Eddy Merckx – considered by many as the greatest cyclist ever
 Jean-Pierre Monseré
 Johan Museeuw
 Sven Nys – cyclo-cross
 Stan Ockers
 Alberic Schotte
 Patrick Sercu
 Andrei Tchmil – Soviet-turned-Ukrainian-turned-Belgian
 Philippe Thys
 Wout Van Aert
 Greg Van Avermaet – Olympic champion
 Frank Vandenbroucke
 Lucien Van Impe
 Rik Van Looy
 Rik Van Steenbergen

Fencing
 Henri Anspach – épée and foil fencer, Olympic champion
 Paul Anspach – épée and foil fencer, two-time Olympic champion
 Jacques Ochs (1883–1971) – épée, saber, and foil fencer, Olympic champion
Gaston Salmon (1878–1917) – épée fencer, Olympic champion

Football (soccer)
:Category: Belgian footballers
 Philippe Albert – player
 Toby Alderweireld – player
 Aimé Anthuenis – coach
 Christian Benteke –  player
 Jean-Marc Bosman – player
 Jan Ceulemans – player, coach
 Lei Clijsters – player, coach
 Rik Coppens – player
 Thibaut Courtois – goalkeeper
 Frank De Bleeckere – referee
 Kevin De Bruyne – player
 Steven Defour – player
 Marc Degryse – player
 Mousa Dembélé – player
 Marouane Fellaini – player
 Eric Gerets – player, coach
 Raymond Goethals – coach
 Georges Grün – player
 Eden Hazard – player
 Thorgan Hazard – player
 Stein Huysegems – player
 Karel Kesselaers – player
 Vincent Kompany – player
 Romelu Lukaku – player
 Joseph Mermans – player
 Vic Mees – player
 Roy Meeus – player
 Thomas Meunier – player
 Simon Mignolet – goalkeeper
 Kevin Mirallas – player
 Emile Mpenza – player
 Jean-Marie Pfaff – goalkeeper
 Michel Preud'homme – goalkeeper, coach
 Enzo Scifo – player, coach
 Timmy Simons – player
 Wesley Sonck – player
 Lorenzo Staelens – player
 Guy Thys – coach
 Youri Tielemans – player
 Gilbert Van Binst – player
 Daniel Van Buyten – player
 Erwin Vandenbergh – player
 Constant Vanden Stock – honorary president and former president and player of football club R.S.C. Anderlecht
 Roger Vanden Stock – president of football club R.S.C. Anderlecht
 Franky Van der Elst – player
 Wim Van Diest – player
 Paul Van Himst – player, coach
 Wilfried Van Moer – player
 Franky Vercauteren – player, coach
 Gert Verheyen – player
 Thomas Vermaelen – player
 Jan Vertonghen – player
 Bernard Voorhoof – player
 Marc Wilmots – football player and elected senator
 Axel Witsel – player

Golf
 Laetitia Beck (born 1992) – Belgian-born Israeli golfer
 Nicolas Colsaerts – Ryder Cup winner
 Thomas Pieters – European Tour winner

Judo
 Ingrid Berghmans – judoka, Olympic champion
 Matthias Casse – judoka
 Jean-Marie Dedecker – coach
 Ilse Heylen – judoka
 Marisabel Lomba – judoka
 Heidi Rakels – judoka
 Harry Van Barneveld – judoka
 Gella Vandecaveye – judoka
 Robert Van De Walle – judoka, Olympic champion
 Charline Van Snick – judoka
 Dirk Van Tichelt – judoka
 Ulla Werbrouck – judoka, Olympic champion

Motocross
 René Baeten – 1958 500cc motocross World Champion
 Marnicq Bervoets – top motocross competitor from the 1990s
 Sven Breugelmans – 2005 MX3-GP World Champion
 Roger De Coster – five-time 500cc Motocross World Champion
 Harry Everts – three-time Motocross World Champion, father of Stefan Everts
 Stefan Everts – ten-time Motocross World Champion
 Eric Geboers – five-time Motocross World Champion
 Sylvain Geboers – motocross des Nations winner
 Georges Jobé – five-time Motocross World Champion
 André Malherbe – three-time Motocross World Champion
 Jacky Martens – 1991 500cc World Champion
 Gaston Rahier – three-time 125cc Motocross World Champion
 Steve Ramon – two-time Motocross World Champion
 Joël Robert – six-time 250cc Motocross World Champion
 Joël Smets – three time 500cc Motocross World Champion

Swimming
 Brigitte Becue – swimmer
 Gérard Blitz – Olympic bronze (100-m backstroke), International Swimming Hall of Fame
 Fred Deburghgraeve – swimmer, Olympic champion (100-m breaststroke)
 Ingrid Lempereur – swimmer
 Pieter Timmers – Olympic silver (100-m front crawl)

Table tennis
 Jean-Michel Saive – player

Tennis
 Sabine Appelmans – player
 Els Callens – player
 Kim Clijsters – player, former World #1, Masters 2002–2003–2010 winner and four-time Grand Slam singles champion
 Steve Darcis – player
 Kirsten Flipkens – player
 David Goffin – player
 Arthur De Greef –player 
 Justine Henin – player, Olympic champion, former World #1, Masters 2006–2007 winner and seven-time Grand Slam singles champion
 Xavier Malisse – player
 Elise Mertens – player
 Dominique Monami – player
 Christophe Rochus – player
 Olivier Rochus – player
 Kristof Vliegen – player
 Yanina Wickmayer – player

Track and field
 Bashir Abdi – athlete
 Eline Berings – athlete
 Dylan Borlée – athlete
 Jonathan Borlée – athlete
 Kevin Borlée – athlete
 Olivia Borlée – athlete
 Fons Brijdenbach – athlete
 Veerle Dejaeghere – track and field athlete
 Peter Genyn – athlete
 Kim Gevaert – athlete, European champion 100 and 200 metres
 Tia Hellebaut – athlete, European champion high jump, Olympic champion high jump
 Karel Lismont – athlete
 Philip Milanov – athlete
 Roger Moens – athlete
 Mohammed Mourhit – athlete
 Koen Naert – athlete, European champion marathon
 Emiel Puttemans – athlete
 Gaston Reiff – athlete, Olympic champion
 Gaston Roelants – athlete, Olympic champion
 Vincent Rousseau – athlete
 Patrick Stevens – athlete
 Nafissatou Thiam – athlete, Olympic, world and European champion heptathlon
 Cédric Van Branteghem – athlete
 Ivo Van Damme – athlete
 William Van Dijck – athlete
 Marieke Vervoort – athlete

Triathlon
 Marc Herremans – wheelchair champion
 Claire Michel
 Kathleen Smet – 2005 world champion
 Marino Vanhoenacker
 Frederik Van Lierde – world champion Iron Man 2013
 Luc Van Lierde – two-time world champion and winner Iron Man
 Benny Vansteelant – four-time world champion duathlon standard and long distance

Water polo
 Gérard Blitz (1901–1979) – swimming and water polo, two-time Olympic silver, two-time bronze (one in swimming – 100-m backstroke), International Swimming Hall of Fame, son of Maurice Blitz
 Gérard Blitz (1912–1990) – water polo player and founder of Club Med
 Maurice Blitz – water poloist, two-time Olympic silver, father of Gérard Blitz
 Henri Cohen – Olympic silver

Other
 Luca Brecel – snooker player
 Annelies Bredael – rower
 Raymond Ceulemans – billiards player
 Frédéric Collignon – table soccer; ITSF multi-time and currently acting world champion
 Nina Derwael – artistic gymnast, world champion uneven bars, two-time European champion
 Nathalie Descamps – badminton player
 Wendy Jans – snooker player, 2006 IBSF Women's World Champion 
Frank Ntilikina – NBA basketball player – French Nationality, born in Belgium
 Tony Parker – NBA basketball player – French nationality, born in Belgium 
 John Raphael, rugby union player
 Jacques Rogge – IOC president
 Tarec Saffiedine – mixed martial artist
 Seppe Smits – snowboarder
 Bart Swings – inline and speed skater
 Paul Van Asbroeck – marksman
 Kevin van der Perren – figure skating
 Hubert Van Innis – archer
Virgile Vandeput (born 1994) – Belgian-born alpine skier who competes for Israel
 Bart Veldkamp – speed skater
 Ann Wauters – WNBA basketball player

Visual artists

Comics

 Jo-El Azara
 Arthur Berckmans (Berck)
 Jan Bosschaert
 Raoul Cauvin
 Jean-Michel Charlier
 Didier Comès
 François Craenhals
 Luc Cromheecke
 Paul Cuvelier
 Dany
 Paul Deliège (Deliège)
 Renaat Demoen
 Bob de Moor
 Christian Denayer
 André-Paul Duchâteau
 Dupa (Luc Dupanloup)
 René Follet
 Philippe Francq
 André Franquin
 Patryck de Froidmont
 Fred Funcken & Liliane Funcken
 François Gilson
 Michel Greg
 René Hausman
 Hergé (Georges Remi)
 Victor Hubinon
 Hermann Huppen (Hermann)
 Edgar P. Jacobs
 Janry (Jean-Richard Geurts)
 Jidéhem (Jean De Mesmaeker)
 Jijé (Joseph Gillain)
 Kamagurka
 Lambil (Willy Lambillote)
 Roger Leloup
 Raymond Macherot
 Marcel Marlier
 Merho
 Midam
 Morris (Maurice de Bevere)
 Jef Nys
 Eddy Paape
 Frank Pé
 Peyo (Pierre Culliford)
 Arthur Piroton
 Marcel Remacle
 Jean Roba
 Eddy Ryssack
 François Schuiten
 Yves Sente
 Marc Sleen (Marc Neels)
 Maurice Tillieux
 Philippe Tome (Philippe Vandevelde)
 William Vance
 Willy Vandersteen
 Jean Van Hamme
 François Walthéry
 Will (Willy Maltaite)

Fashion
 Antwerp Six
 Dirk Bikkembergs
 Veronique Branquino
 Liz Claiborne – American designer born in Belgium
 Elise Crombez
 Ann Demeulemeester
 Martin Margiela
 Hanne Gaby Odiele
 Elvis Pompilio
 Raf Simons
 Olivier Strelli
 Walter Van Beirendonck
 Dries van Noten
 Édouard Vermeulen

Painters

 Pierre Alechinsky – Cobra member
 Joachim Beuckelaer
 Adriaen Brouwer
 Pieter Bruegel the Elder, and his family, including Pieter Brueghel the Younger, Jan Brueghel the Elder, and Jan Brueghel the Younger
 Robert Campin
 Petrus Christus
 Emile Claus – impressionism
 Gerard David
 Philippe de Champaigne
 Jos De Cock
 Gaspar de Crayer
 Raoul De Keyser – abstract painter
 Paul Delvaux – surrealist
 Jean Delville – symbolist painter
 Albert Demuyser
 Gustave De Smet – expressionism
 Sam Dillemans
 James Ensor
 Frans Floris
 Adriaen Isenbrandt
 Jacob Jordaens
 Justus of Ghent
 Claire Kerwin
 Fernand Khnopff –  symbolist
 Luc Lafnet
 Georges Emile Lebacq – Impressionist, Post-Impressionist painter
 Limbourg brothers – manuscript illuminators
 Lambert Lombard
 Jan Mabuse
 René Magritte  – surrealist
 Xavier Mellery  – symbolist
 Hans Memling
 Kwinten Metsys (a.k.a. Quentin Matsys/Quentin Massys)
 Joseph Noiret – painter and poet
 Constant Permeke – expressionist
 Pieter Pourbus
 Roger Raveel
 Félicien Rops
 Peter Paul Rubens – Baroque painter
 Victor Servranckx – cubist
 Frans Snyders
 Leon Spilliaert
 David Teniers the Younger
 Luc Tuymans
 Pieter van Aelst
 Joos van Cleve
 Frits Van den Berghe – expressionist
 Hugo van der Goes
 Rogier van der Weyden (a.k.a. Rog(i)er de la Pasture)original name : Rogier de LE Pasture in his city of Tournai
 Gustave Van de Woestijne
 Sir Anthony van Dyck (Antoon van Dyck)
 Jan van Eyck and his brother Hubert van Eyck
 Peter Van Gheluwe
 Anne-Mie Van Kerckhoven
 Eugeen Van Mieghem
 Bernard van Orley
 Théo van Rysselberghe – neo-impressionist
 Fernand Verhaegen – painter of Walloon folklore
 Antoine Joseph Wiertz

Photographers
 Dirk Braeckman
 Carl De Keyzer
 Bieke Depoorter
 Martine Franck
 Harry Gruyaert
 Filip Naudts
 Leon Van Loo
 Stephan Vanfleteren

Sculptors
 Delphine Boël
 René Carcan
 May Claerhout
Patrick Damiaens
 Jean Del Cour
 François Duquesnoy
 Jan Fabre
 Lucas Faydherbe
 Jean-Michel Folon
 George Grard
 Constantin Meunier
 Léon Mignon
 George Minne
 Olivier Strebelle
Peter van Dievoet
 Rik Wouters

Others
 Guillaume Bijl
 Ade Bethune
 Guy Bleus
 Marcel Broodthaers
 Jean De Bast
 Victor Delhez
 Wim Delvoye
 Danny Devos
 Dr. Hugo Heyrman
 Solange Knopf
 Panamarenko
 Eefje Depoortere

Others
 Arturo Alfandari – diplomat, creator of the language Neo
 Christophe De Kepper – lawyer
 Menachem Banitt – expert in medieval French language and culture
 Edgard Colle – chess player
 Sabine Dardenne – victim of child molester Marc Dutroux
 Jeanne de Bellem – political activist during the Brabant revolution
 Thierry de Duve – art critic and theorist
 Augustine De Rothmaler – pedagogue and feminist
 Henri Kichka (1926–2020) – writer and Holocaust survivor
 Paul de Man – deconstructionist literary critic and theorist
 Joanna DeRoover – oldest documented living person in Belgium at the time of her death
 Piet Huysentruyt – chef and bestselling author
 Jean-Denis Lejeune – founder of Child Focus
 Claude Lelièvre – commissioner for children rights, French-speaking community
 Jean-Baptiste Moëns – "father of philately"
 Peter Piot – Director of UNAIDS
 Zara Rutherford – Belgian-British aviator
 Sybille de Selys Longchamps
 Vanden Geyhn et Van Aerschodt – bell and carillon founders
 Pierre Wynants – chef

See also
 Belgian Americans
 List of Belgian Americans
 List of Belgian women writers
 List of Belgium-related topics
 List of fictional Belgians
 Belgian Brazilians 
 Flemish people 
 List of people by nationality
 List of people from Brussels
 De Grootste Belg

Notes